Juan Eduardo Martín (born 27 April 1982) is a professional Argentinian football player. He is currently playing for Club Atlético Belgrano.

References

External links
 Juan Eduardo Martín at BDFA.com.ar 
 Footmercato profile 
 

1982 births
Living people
Argentine footballers
Primera Nacional players
A.O. Kerkyra players
Olympiacos Volos F.C. players
Super League Greece players
Defensa y Justicia footballers
Estudiantes de Buenos Aires footballers
Defensores de Belgrano footballers
Club Almirante Brown footballers
Club Atlético Belgrano footballers
Club Atlético Douglas Haig players
Club Atlético Los Andes footballers
Expatriate footballers in Greece
Argentine expatriate footballers
Association football forwards